De turno con la angustia, is a 1969 Mexican telenovela produced by Raúl Astor and directed by Arturo Salgado by Televisa. Michoacán Its setting was to Mexico City starting the history of the telenovela February 8, 1957, in Michoacan and then spent 11 years after 1968.

Cast 
 Lucy Gallardo as Susana Correa
 Aarón Hernán as Miguel Cossio
 Martha Roth as Elena Barbosa
 Gregorio Casal as Antonio Borghetti
 Marina Baura as María Gabriela de Borghetti
 Carlos Amador as  Fernández 
 Jorge Lavat as Rosendo Galván
 Rosenda Monteros as Lydia
 Marina Marín as Mayra
 Raúl Boxer as Guardiàn
 Miguel Suárez as Tomás
 Ángela Villanueva as Ivette

References 

Mexican telenovelas
Televisa telenovelas
Spanish-language telenovelas
1969 telenovelas
1969 Mexican television series debuts
1969 Mexican television series endings